Eternal Law is a 2012 ITV fantasy drama series created  by Ashley Pharoah and Matthew Graham. The show stars Samuel West, Ukweli Roach, Orla Brady, Tobias Menzies and Hattie Morahan. Set in York, it is centred on two angels sent to Earth to assist in court cases. The first episode premiered on 5 January 2012. The show was axed after one series due to low ratings.

Plot
Mr. Mountjoy (God, spoken of but never seen) sends two wing-bearing angels to Earth to help humans with their problems. Humans cannot see the angels' wings except in exceptional circumstances, like being close to death. Zak Gist (Samuel West) is an experienced angel, 14 billion years old (episode six), who has been to Earth before. Tom Greening (Ukweli Roach) is an angel still learning the ways of humans. It is decided that the pair can best help humans as barristers in York, England. In York they are met by Mrs. Sheringham (Orla Brady), an angel who became mortal to marry Billy, a human, but, was widowed; she arranges offices and accommodation with her at The Belfry. She kept her old pair of wings in a trunk before throwing them into a river during the series. In court they cross paths with a fallen angel, Richard Pembroke (Tobias Menzies), who is also a barrister, usually prosecuting. In episode six, Richard's wings are seen - they are black. Zak also meets Hannah English, a woman with whom he is in love from one of his past visits to Earth, but who does not recognize him.

The prime rule for the angels is non-interference in the free will of humanity. The angels are allowed to guide and comfort, but have powers to influence the human mind, which they must resist the temptation to use. Mr. Mountjoy, bothered by the number of angels choosing to interfere and the number of angels choosing to become mortal, may decide to remove all angelic guidance and comfort if Zak or Tom stray from the rules. Zak believes this would eventually spell doom for humans.

Production notes
The series was filmed in York and the Cathedral you see the Angels standing on is York Minster. The location used to portray York Hospital in the series is in fact the city's Crown Court building, while a former private hospital (Purey Cust Nuffield Hospital) provides a location for Jerusalem Chambers. Mansion House serves as the location of the Crown Court in the series. Scenes are also filmed at Gray's Court and St William's College, both close to York Minster.

Cast and characters
Samuel West as angel Zak Gist
Ukweli Roach as angel Thomas Greening
Tobias Menzies as fallen angel Richard Pembroke
Orla Brady as former angel Mrs Sherringham
Hattie Morahan as Hannah English

Episode list

Series 1 (2012)

DVD
A region 2 DVD of the first series was released on 12 February 2012.

Notes

References

External links

2010s British drama television series
2012 British television series debuts
2012 British television series endings
2010s British television miniseries
2010s British legal television series
English-language television shows
ITV television dramas
Television shows set in Yorkshire
British fantasy television series
Television series by Endemol